Deborah or Debbie Gordon may refer to:

Deborah M. Gordon, biologist at Stanford University who studies ant colony behavior and ecology
Debbie Gordon, Brookside character
Debbie Gordon, former member of The Dicks